The Bay State Games are an Olympic-style athletic event for amateur athletes in the state of Massachusetts, which includes several divisions and allows athletes of all ages to compete. The Games are divided into Summer and Winter Games.  The Summer Games include 25 sports and are usually held in late July. The Winter Games include three different sports and are usually held in late January or early February. The Bay State Games is a member of the National Congress of State Games. Kevin Cummings currently serves as executive director.

Overview 
The Massachusetts Amateur Sports Foundation (MASF), organizer of the Bay State Summer and Winter Games, provides Olympic-style athletic competitions and developmental programs for Massachusetts amateur athletes of all ages and abilities. The MASF operates statewide and year-round to promote personal development, education, physical fitness, teamwork, sportsmanship, and mutual respect. The MASF is a member of the National Congress of State Games, which comprises 35 states nationwide that conduct State Games events.

In 2019, the Bay State Summer Games celebrated its 38th anniversary. In 2020, the Bay State Winter Games enjoyed its 35th year. From a modest beginning of four sports and 300 athletes, the Games have grown to include almost 6,000 athletes in 35 different sports from more than 300 Massachusetts cities and towns. Each sport is organized according to national governing body rules. Age and skill divisions have been created to allow medal opportunities for a broad range of athletes.

The Bay State Games is one of the largest amateur multi-sports organizations in the state of Massachusetts. This non-profit organization is a member of the National Congress of State Games, associated with the United States Olympic Committee and its Affiliated Organization Council. The Bay State Games’ mission is to promote personal development, education, health, physical fitness, teamwork and sportsmanship through recreational and educational programs. Over 6,000 Massachusetts residents ranging in age from 6 to 86 participate in these programs each year. Each year, the Bay State Games has over 1,000 volunteer including coaches, referees, and medical staff.

History 
The Bay State Games was founded by Dave McGillivray in 1982. McGillivray was on the Governor’s Council of Physical Fitness and Sports and wanted to create a statewide summer sports festival for Massachusetts. He appointed Doug Arnot to pitch the idea of “Sportsfest” to the commonwealth of Massachusetts and to become the executive director (1982-1992). “Sportsfest” began with only four sports with 500 athletes. Peter Thomsen (1992-1996), Charlie Noonan (1996-1998), Linda Driscoll (1998-1999), and Kevin Cummings (1999-present) have all served as executive director. 

The Games’ breakthrough year came in 1985. Basketball became the Game’s showcase event in both women's and men’s divisions. That same year, Arnot developed the idea of creating a winter sports festival for Massachusetts athletes. The Winter Games took place in the Northern Berkshire region because of the facilities available to them. Four hundred athletes took part in the 1985 Winter Games with competitions that included figure skating, alpine skiing, cross country skiing, and speed skating. Figure skating is the only sport to be included in every Winter Games. Masters ice hockey, youth ice hockey, speed skating, ski orienteering, snowboarding, sled dog racing, and cross country skiing were added into the competitions as the Winter Games became more successful.

Winter Games 
The Winter Games are usually held in the months of January, February, and March in the Northern Berkshire region of Massachusetts. Featured sports include figure skating, curling, masters ice hockey, and futsal. Each year, the Winter Games have featured the Bay State Skate Figure Skating Show. This show was created in the 1980s to display some of the best skaters in the Winter Games. The Bay State Skate has more than a dozen Olympic skaters from the National and World Championships.  Shows presented by the Bay State Games have included Olympians Nancy Kerrigan, Paul Wylie, Surya Bonaly, Linda Frattiani, Sylvia Fontana, and National competitors Mark Mitchell and Jennifer Kirk.  The athletes in the Winter Games represent over 200 Massachusetts communities and participants range from ages 5 to 62.

Events (as of 2020)
Curling
Figure Skating
Futsal
Ice hockey

Summer Games 
The Summer Games is Massachusetts' own Olympic-style athletic competition that has been held since 1982 and features more than 6,000 athletes in 30 sports. Athletes represent over 300 Massachusetts communities, and participants range in age from 5 to 86. The Bay States Games reached it popularity in the 1990s when the number of participants increased to over 10,000 athletes.  Over the years, the Bay State Games has expanded and focused more on individual sports such as swimming and track and field. Also, rugby has been one of the Games’ fastest growing sports. Master divisions were created and recreational sports such as baton twirling, judo, table tennis, and badminton. The Summer Games span is six to seven weeks in June and July. Tryouts for the Summer Games are held throughout the month of June, with finals taking place in the Metro-Boston and central Massachusetts area in mid-July.

Events (as of 2020)
Archery
Badminton
Baseball
Basketball
Baton Twirling
Fencing
Field Hockey
6 vs 6 Field Hockey
Basic Skills Figure Skating
Footgolf
Ice hockey
Judo
Lacrosse
Pickleball
Rugby Sevens
Shooting Sports - Pistol, Trap, Rifle
Soccer
Softball
Swimming
Synchronized Swimming
Table Tennis
Track & Field
Ultimate
Volleyball
Weightlifting
Wrestling

Programs

Future Leaders Scholarship Program 
The Future Leaders Scholarship annually awards six $1,000 college scholarships to Bay State Summer and Winter Games participants. The MASF is proud to award these scholarships to student-athletes who demonstrate leadership through community service, academic excellence and athletic achievement. Since its inception, more than $400,000 has been awarded to students who have gone on to successful careers at prestigious institutions.

High School Ambassador Program 
The High School Ambassador program works with high school students who are interested in a career in marketing or sport management. Ambassadors actively promote Bay State Games in their schools by hanging up posters, meeting with athletic directors and coaches, and sharing posts on social media.

Internship Program 
The Bay State Games Internship Program offers candidates the opportunity to gain valuable experience in all phases of sport management. Interns will have the opportunity to learn about event management, financial management, operations, sponsorship fulfillment, and media relations. Unlike many other internships, the Bay State Games Internship Program allows candidates to take ownership of specific projects and manage events. Alumni of the BSG Internship Program have gone onto careers professional and collegiate sports, including the New York Jets, Miami Dolphins, and the Big East Conference,

Sports Medicine Symposium 
In conjunction with Boston Children’s Hospital Division of Sports Medicine, the MASF sponsors an annual sports medicine conference to educate athletic trainers and sports medicine professionals on current trends in the field. Participants earn continuing education units to maintain their certification.

Bay State Games Hall of Fame 
The Bay State Games Hall of Fame recognizes athletes, volunteers, coaches, officials, organizers and commissioners who have had an extraordinary impact on the people and communities that are a part of the Games. Inductees include former Bay State Games athletes who competed in the Olympics, NBA, NHL, or MLB.

Class of 2019
Yvonne Chern – BSG Badminton Co-Commissioner 
Beth Sopka – BSG Badminton Co-Commissioner 
Orlando Vandross – BSG Basketball Athlete & Coach, Asst. Coach Virginia NCAA Men Basketball National Champions 
Charlie Titus – BSG Board Member 

Class of 2018
Samantha Livingstone – BSG Swimming Athlete, NCAA Champion, 2000 US Olympic Gold Medalist
Tara Danielson – BSG Field Hockey Athlete, US National Team, Head Coach Stanford Field Hockey
Denis Reno – BSG Weightlifting Co-Commissioner
Dave Lussier – BSG Weightlifting Co-Commissioner

Class of 2017
Tom Thibodeau – BSG Basketball Coach. NBA Head Coach, Chicago, Minnesota, New York
Chris Lane – BSG Track & Field Officials Coordinator
David Blake – BSG Fencing Commissioner 

Class of 2016
Jim Carboneau – BSG Lacrosse Officials Coordinator
Tracey Gangi Johnson – BSG Baton Twirling Commissioner
Dr. Arthur Pappas – BSG Board Member & Chair

Class of 2015
David Harrison – BSG Board Member
Joe LeMar – BSG Track Athlete, Board Member, Paralympic Games Gold medal 1992, Bronze 2000.
Greg Derr – BSG Shooting Athlete, US 1996 Olympic Shooting Team Member

Class of 2014
Dr. Lyle Micheli – BSG Medical Team
Dr. Pierre D’Hemecourt – BSG Medical Team
Bill Cleary – BSG Board Member, Harvard Athletic Director, Olympic Ice Hockey Silver Medalist
Keith Yandle – BSG Ice Hockey Athlete, 15 year NHL veteran, 3 time all star

Class of 2013
Katy Hayden – BSG Figure Skating Commissioner
Rich Hill – BSG Baseball Athlete, 18-year MLB player
Jack Sordillo – BSG Board Member

Class of 2012
Rick Meara – BSG Judo Commissioner 
New Balance – Sponsor 
Elena Pirozhkova – BSG Wrestling Athlete, 2012 Olympic Team & World Champion 

Class of 2011
Carlos Pena – BSG Baseball Athlete, MLB player & All-Star
Ted Neill – BSG Wrestling Officials Coordinator
Carol Kronopolus – BSG Field Hockey Officials Coordinator

Class of 2010
Jim Fanning – BSG Softball Commissioner & Officials Coordinator
Patty Flanagan – BSG Synchronized Swimming Commissioner
Jack Aborn – BSG Archery Commissioner

Class of 2009
Bill Guerin – BSG hockey athlete & gold medalist. NHL, two-time Stanley Cup Champion
Ann Welch – BSG Volunteer
Bob McCorry – BSG Shooting Commissioner 
Peter Buxton – BSG Board Member

Class of 2008
Sarah Behn - Second leading scorer in Massachusetts Girls basketball history, All American at Boston College, Leading scorer in Big East Conference Women's Basketball history.
Mike Burns - College Soccer All American, Member of 1992 US Olympic Men's Soccer Team, Member of 1998 US World Cup Soccer Team, 7-year player for MLS Soccer
Joe Chirico - Diving Commissioner
Rachel Woo - Bay State Games Soccer Officials Coordinator

Class of 2007
Nancy Kerrigan - Participant in first BSG figure skating event in 1985. Two-time Olympian.
Dave Marcus - Table Tennis Commissioner.
Joe Cacciatore - Baseball Umpire Commissioner
Bruce McAndrews - Member of Winter Games organizing committee for over 20 years.

Class of 2006
Dana Barros - Two time BSG Basketball medalist. 13-year NBA veteran and NBA all-star.
Doug Arnot - Founded Bay State Games in 1982 and served as executive director from 1982-1992
Athletic Trainers of Massachusetts - Supported BSG since 1982 for medical coverage.
Rich Moran - 20-year Summer Games volunteer.

Class of 2005
Kelly Dostal - BSG Field Hockey athlete, 3 time NCAA champion and player of the year.
Jim Maher - Wrestling Commissioner
Louise Wing - 22-year Synchro Swimming athlete, National State Games Athlete of the Year.
Diane Wilcox - 24-year volunteer

Class of 2004
UMass Boston - Host of Summer Finals for 20 years
Jeanne King - 20-year volunteer from Verizon
Jimmy Pedro - Bay State Games Wrestling athlete, 4 time Olympian in *Judo

Class of 2003
Tom Lynch - Ice Hockey Officials Coordinator
Jim Underwood - Soccer Commissioner
Rebecca Lobo - Two time BSG Basketball medalist, Olympic medalist & NCAA Champion.

Class of 2002
Reggie Lewis - Two time BSG Basketball medalist, former member Boston Celtics.
Leda Levine - Field Hockey Commissioner
Barb Cece - Figure Skating Commissioner

Class of 2001
Charlie Butterfield - Track & Field Commissioner
Rob Garon - Swimming Commissioner
Melissa Mulloy-Mecozzi - Shooting Athlete, member Olympic shooting team

Notable Bay State Games alumni 
Dana Barros
Bay State Summer Games Boys Scholastic & Men’s Open Basketball Athlete
Played for Boston College. 1988 Big East 1st team selection. BC number retired
Played in NBA from 1989 – 2004
1995 NBA All-Star
Surya Bonaly
1999 Bay State Skate Figure Skating Show Performer
1992, 1994 and 1998 French Olympic Figure Skating Team Member
Michael Botticelli and Cheryl Franks
Bay State Skate Figure Skating Show Performers
1980 U.S. Pairs Figure Skating Olympic Team Members
Mike Burns
Bay State Summer Games Boys' Scholastic Soccer Athlete
1992 U.S. Olympic Soccer Team Member
1996-2002 MLS Player
Member of the 1998 U.S. World Cup Soccer Team
Kitty Carruthers and Peter Carruthers
Bay State Skate Figure Skating Show Performers
1980 and 1984 U.S. Pairs Figure Skating Olympic Team Members
Karen Cashman
Bay State Winter Games Figure Skating Competitor
1994 U.S. Olympic Speed Skating bronze medalist (3000m relay)
Pat Connaughton
Bay State Games Baseball Athlete 
Played for University of Notre Dame in Baseball & Basketball 
2014 MLB Draft 4th Round Pick for Baltimore Orioles
2015 NBA Draft 2nd Round Pick for New Jersey Nets
Currently plays for the Milwaukee Bucks
Currently plays for the Milwaukee Bucks (NBA)
Jim Craig
Bay State Winter Games Masters Ice Hockey Athlete
1980 U.S. Olympic Ice Hockey Team Member
Bill Curley
Bay State Summer Games Boys' Scholastic and Men's Open Basketball Athlete
1994 to 1998 NBA Player
Head Coach Emerson College Men's Basketball Team
Tara Danielson
Bay State Games Field Hockey athlete
U.S. Field Hockey National Team Member 1998-2005
Competed in Pan American Games, World Cup, and Olympic Qualifiers
Former head Coach of Stanford University Field Hockey Team
Greg Derr
Bay State Summer Games Shooting competitor
1996 U.S. Olympic Shooting Team Member
6-time member of the US Shooting Team at the World Championships
Kelly Dostal
Bay State Summer Games Scholastic Field Hockey athlete
Three-time All-American and National Champion at Wake Forest (2002–04)
2016 Inductee to Wake Forest University Athletic Hall of Fame 
Philip Dulebohn and Tiffany Scott
Bay State Skate Figure Skating Show Performers
Bay State Winter Games Figure Skating Competitor (Scott)
2002 U.S. Pairs Figure Skating Olympic Team Members
Howard Eisley
Bay State Summer Games Men's Open Basketball athlete
Member of the Boston College Men’s Basketball Team
NBA Player (1994-1996)
Scott Gregory and Suzanne Semanick
Bay State Skate Figure Skating Show Performers
Bay State Winter Games Figure Skating athlete (Semanick)
1988 U.S. Ice Dancing Olympic Team Members
Bill Guerin
Bay State Summer Games Boys' Scholastic Ice Hockey Athlete & Gold Medalist
1998, 2002, and 2006 U.S. Ice Hockey Olympic Team Member
18-year NHL Veteran 
Two-time Stanley Cup Champion, four-time NHL All Star, and league MVP in 2001
James Chico Hernandez
Bay State Summer Games Wrestling Competitor
Five-time U.S. Sambo National Team Member (2000–2005)
World Cup Sambo Vice-Champion (2000)
Rich Hill
Bay State Games Baseball athlete 
18-year MLB veteran
David Jensen
Bay State Winter Games Masters Ice Hockey athlete
1984 U.S. Olympic Ice Hockey Team Member
Nancy Kerrigan
1985 Bay State Winter Games Figure Skating Competitor
1992 Bay State Skate Figure Skating Show Performer
1992 and 1994 U.S. Olympic Figure Skating Medalist
Joe Lemar
Bay State Games Track & Field athlete
Bay State Games Board Member 
1992 Barcelona Paralympics Gold Medalist 
2000 Sydney Paralympics Bronze Medalist
Reggie Lewis
1985 and 1986 Bay State Summer Games Men's Open Basketball athlete
NBA Player - Boston Celtics (1987-1993)
Samantha Livingstone
Bay State Games Swimming Gold Medalist 
2000 Sydney Olympic Swimming Gold Medalist 
Seven-time NCAA All-American Women's Swimming 
Co-Captain University of Georgia 2005 NCAA Women's Swimming National Championship Team
Rebecca Lobo
Bay State Summer Games Girl's Scholastic Basketball athlete
1995 NCAA Women’s Basketball National Champion
1996 U.S. Olympic Basketball Team Member
1997 to 2003 WNBA Player
Melissa Malloy
Bay State Summer Games Shooting Competitor
2000 U.S. Olympic Shooting Team Member
Kevin McGlinchy
Bay State Summer Games Baseball athlete
MLB Player - Atlanta Braves (1999-2000)
Jimmy Pedro
Bay State Summer Games Wrestling Competitor
Four-time U.S. Olympic Judo Team Member (1992, 96, 2000, 04)
Two-time Olympic Silver Medalist (1996, 2004)
Carlos Pena
Bay State Games Baseball athlete
13-year MLB Veteran
2009 MLB All-Star
2009 AL Home Run Leader
Elena Pirozhkova
Bay State Games Wrestling athlete
2012 & 2016 member of U.S. Olympic Women's Wrestling Team 
World Women's Wrestling Championships - Gold (2012), Silver (2010 & 2014), Bronze (2013)
Pan American Championship Gold Medalist 2008, 2009, and 2010
Stephen Scherer
Bay State Summer Games Shooting Competitor
2008 U.S. Olympic Shooting Team Member
Krista Schmidinger
1985 Bay State Winter Games Alpine Skiing athlete
1992 and 1994 U.S. Alpine Skiing Olympic Team Member
Nikki Stone
Bay State Winter Games Alpine Skiing Competitor
1998 U.S. Olympic Aerial Skiing Team Member
Tom Thibodeau
Bay State Games Basketball Coach
Former Assistant Coach - Boston Celtics 
Former Head Coach - Chicago Bulls, Minnesota Timberwolves
Current Head Coach - New York Knicks
Orlando Vandross
Bay State Games Basketball Athlete and Men's Open Basketball coach
Previously served as Assistant Men's Basketball Coach at Boston University and Charlotte University
Currently serves as Assistant Coach at University of Virginia. 
Member of the coaching staff that won the 2019 Division I Men's Basketball National Championship
Kara Wolters
Bay State Summer Games Girls' Scholastic Basketball athlete
2000 U.S. Olympic Basketball Team Member
WNBA Player (1999-2003)
Nicole Woods 
Bay State Games Field Hockey Athlete 
Four-year Field Hockey player at University of Louisville, 3-time Al-ACC selection
Member of the U.S. Field Hockey National Team
Paul Wylie
1992 Bay State Skate Figure Skating Show Performer
1992 U.S. Olympic Figure Skating Silver Medalist
Keith Yandle
Bay State Games Ice Hockey athlete 
15-year NHL veteran 
3-time NHL All-Star

References

https://www.baystategames.org/

External links
 

1982 establishments in Massachusetts
Multi-sport events in the United States
Recurring sporting events established in 1982
Sports competitions in Massachusetts